Thilogne is a small town in north-east Senegal with the status of a commune. It lies in the Matam Department  of Matam Region,  from Kaédi, Mauretania and connected to Dakar via the N2 road. 

In 2013 Thilogne had a population of just over 10,000. There are twelve mosques, two elementary schools, a middle school, and a lycée (high school). There is a dispensary and a small market.

Thilogne is twinned with Trappes in France.

History
Thilogne is part of the Futa Tooro region of northwestern Senegal. From the 9th to the 13th centuries it was part of the state of Takrur and by the Empire of Great Fulo from AD 1490 to 1776 when it was taken over by France and served as the capital of Fouta.

During the 1960s and 1970s, Thilogne was part of Matam Department, Fleuve Region.

The Thilogne Association Développement (Thilogne Development Association) was established in 1995; it organizes a festival every two years and has helped to rehalititate and construct schools and a dispensary.

References

Populated places in Matam Region
Communes of Senegal